Yanghee Lee (born 24 July 1956) is a South Korean developmental psychologist and professor at Sungkyunkwan University. She is most noted for her work in international human rights organisations.

Education
Lee earned her undergraduate (B.S.) degree from Georgetown University. She later undertook postgraduate studies at the University of Missouri and earned an M.ED. and Ph.D.

Human rights works and United Nations career
Yanghee Lee currently serves on the Advisory committee of the National Human Rights Commission of Korea. She is the founding President of the International Child Rights Center, a non-profit organization based in Seoul. In 2009, she received the Order of Civil Merit, the highest recognition given to a civilian in Korea, for her work in human rights.

Lee served as chairperson of the Committee on the Rights of the Child under the UN High Commissioner for Human Rights from 2007 to 2011. She also served as chairperson of the Meeting of Chairpersons of Human Rights Treaty Bodies from 2010 to 2011.

Lee was appointed special rapporteur of the UN on the situation of human rights in Myanmar first established in 1992 under the Commission on Human Rights Resolution 58 and extended annually. Following usual practice, her appointment as special rapporteur on the situation of human rights in Myanmar was extended for one year in March 2019. The Open Society Foundation funded her work through several grants to the Sungkyunkwan University destined to support her research.  The Myanmar government has denied access to Lee.

Lee is highly recognized nationally, regionally, and internationally for her expertise in human rights. She has published numerous articles and books on human rights and children’s rights. She was awarded the 2009 Human Rights Award of Korea, as winner.

Titles, awards and honours
  2009: Human Rights Award of Korea as Winner, National Human Rights Commission of Korea

References

1956 births
Living people
South Korean psychologists
South Korean women psychologists
Developmental psychologists
South Korean human rights activists
Academic staff of Sungkyunkwan University
Georgetown University alumni
University of Missouri alumni